Last Will is a 2011 mystery drama film starring Tatum O'Neal and Tom Berenger. It was shot in Kansas City, Missouri on a modest budget.

Plot 
A woman named Hayden is framed for the murder of her wealthy husband Frank. With all the evidence stacked against her, Detective Sloan arrests her and Hayden finds herself in the fight of her life as she tries to uncover the truth. Set against the backdrop of a wealthy Midwestern city, Last Will tells a story of deception, corruption and misguided family loyalties.

Cast 
 Tatum O'Neal as Hayden Emery
 Tom Berenger as Frank Emery
 Patrick Muldoon as Joseph Emery
 Peter Coyote as Judge Garner
 Shawn Huff as Laurie Faber
 William Shockley as Michael Palmer
 Jeffery Dean as Virgil Emery
 James Brolin as Det. Sloan
 Moon Zappa as Belinda DeNovi

Reception
Horrorphilia said "If you are looking for a twisted thriller with some top-notch actors, do yourself a favor and look for ‘Last Will’. The ending twist was good and maybe if you pay close attention, it won't sneak up on you. Although what happened after the big reveal...I bet you don't see it coming! 4 Out of 5!"

References

External links
 
 
 

2011 films
2010s mystery drama films
American mystery drama films
Films scored by Pinar Toprak
Films shot in Missouri
2011 drama films
2010s English-language films
2010s American films